The gateway drug effect (alternatively, stepping-stone theory, escalation hypothesis, or progression hypothesis) is a comprehensive catchphrase for the often observed effect that the use of a psychoactive substance is coupled to an increased probability of the use of further substances. Possible causes are biological alterations in the brain due to the earlier substance exposure and similar attitudes of people who use different substances across different substances (common liability to addiction). In 2020, the National Institute on Drug Abuse released a study backing allegations that marijuana is a "gateway" to more dangerous substance use, though not for the majority of people who use substances. A literature review by the United States Department of Justice found no conclusive evidence that the link is causal.

Sequence of first-time use

General concept 
The concept of gateway drug is based on observations that the sequence of first-time use of different drugs is not random but shows trends. On the basis of established techniques of longitudinal studies such trends can be described precisely in terms of statistical probability. As to the interpretation of the observed trends, it is important to note the difference between sequence and causation. Both may – but need not – be coupled, a question which is subject of further research, e.g., by physiological experiments.

Examples of trends 

From a sample of 6,624 people who had not used other illegal drugs before their cannabis consumption the overall probability of later use of other illegal drugs was estimated to be 44.7%. Subgroup analyses showed that personal and social conditions, such as gender, age, marital status, mental disorders, family history of substance use, overlapping illegal drug distribution channels, alcohol use disorder, nicotine dependence, ethnicity, urbanicity, and educational attainment influenced the height of probability.

A study of drug use of 14,577 U.S. 12th graders showed that alcohol consumption was associated with an increased probability of later use of tobacco, cannabis, and other illegal drugs. Adolescents who smoked cigarettes before age 15 were up to 80 times more likely to use illegal drugs. Studies indicate vaping serves as a gateway to traditional cigarettes and cannabis use.

Large-scale longitudinal studies in the U.K. and New Zealand from 2015 and 2017 showed an association between cannabis use and an increased probability of later disorders in the use of other drugs.

Students who regularly consume caffeinated energy drinks have a greater risk of alcohol use disorder, cocaine use and misuse of prescription stimulants. The elevated risk remains after accounting for prior substance use and other risk factors.

A meta-analysis of 2018 came to the conclusion that the use of electronic cigarettes increases the risk of later use of conventional cigarettes.

Associations aside from first-time use 
The role of cannabis use in regard to alcohol use and Alcohol Use Disorder (AUD) is still not fully understood. Some studies suggest better alcohol treatment completion for those who use cannabis, while other studies find the opposite. A recent review of 39 studies which examined the relation between cannabis use and alcohol use found that 16 studies support the idea that cannabis and alcohol are substitutes for each other, 10 studies found that they are complements, 12 found that they are neither complementary nor substitutes, and one found that they are both.

A study involving self-reported data from a sample of 27,461 people examined the relationship of cannabis use and AUD. These respondents had no prior diagnosis of AUD. Of the 27,461 people, 160 had reported cannabis use within the past year. At the end of a three-year period, it found that those who had previously reported cannabis use were associated with a five times greater odds of being diagnosed with AUD than those who had not. After adjustment for select confounders (age, race, marital status, income, and education), these odds were reduced to two times greater risk. Another sample of self-reported data from 2,121 persons included only those who had already been diagnosed with AUD. In this sample, it was found that those who had reported cannabis use in the past year (416 people) were associated with 1.7 greater odds of AUD persistence three years later. After adjustment for the same confounders as before, these odds were reduced to 1.3.

Causes 
Because a sequence of first-time use can only indicate the possibility – but not the fact – of an underlying causal relation, different theories concerning the observed trends were developed. The scientific discussion (state of 2016) is dominated by two concepts, which appear to cover almost all possible causal connections if appropriately combined. These are the theories of biological alterations in the brain due to an earlier drug use and the theory of similar attitudes across different drugs.

Alterations in the brain 
Adolescent rats repeatedly injected with tetrahydrocannabinol increased the self-administration of heroin (results based on 11 male rats and >50 male rats), morphine (study based on 12 male rats) and also nicotine (34 rats). There were direct indications that the alteration consisted of lasting anatomical changes in the reward system of the brain. Because the reward system is anatomically, physiologically, and functionally almost identical across the class of mammals, the importance of the findings from animal studies for the reward system in the human brain in relation to the liability to the use of further drugs has been pointed out in several reviews.

In mice, nicotine increased the probability of later consumption of cocaine, and the experiments permitted concrete conclusions on the underlying molecular biological alteration in the brain. The biological changes in mice correspond to the  epidemiological observations in humans that nicotine consumption is coupled to an increased probability of later use of cannabis and cocaine, as well as other drugs.

In rats, alcohol increased the probability of later addiction to cocaine and again relevant alterations in the reward system were identified. These observations thus correspond to the epidemiological findings that the consumption of alcohol in humans is coupled to a later increased risk of a transition from cocaine use to cocaine addiction.

Controlled animal and human studies showed that caffeine (energy drinks) in combination with alcohol increased the craving for more alcohol more strongly than alcohol alone. These findings correspond to epidemiological data that people who consume energy drinks generally showed an increased tendency to take alcohol and other substances.

Personal, social and genetic factors 
According to the concept of similar attitudes across different drugs (common liability to addiction), a number of personal, social, genetic and environmental factors can lead to a generally increased interest in various drugs. The sequence of first-time use would then depend on these factors. Violations of the typical sequence of first-time drug usage give credit to this theory. For example, in Japan, where cannabis use is uncommon, 83.2% of the people who used illicit substances did not use cannabis first. The concept received additional support from a large-scale genetic analysis that showed a genetic basis for the connection of the prevalence of cigarette smoking and cannabis use during the life of a person.

The results of a twin study presented indications that familial genetic and familial environmental factors do not fully explain these associations, and are possibly only relevant for sequences of some drugs. In 219 same-sex Dutch identical and non-identical twin pairs, one co-twin had reported cannabis use before the age of 18 whereas the other had not. In the cannabis group the lifetime prevalence of later reported use of party drugs was four times higher and the lifetime prevalence of later reported use of hard drugs was seven times higher than in the non-cannabis group. The authors concluded that at least family influences – both genetic and social ones – could not explain the differences. The study noted that, besides a potential causal role of cannabis use, non shared environment factors could play a role in the association such as differing peer affiliations that preceded the cannabis use.

Another twin study (of 510 same sex twin pairs) also examined the association of earlier cannabis use and later hard drug use. Like other studies it examined later drug use differences between siblings where one sibling had used cannabis early and the other had not. The study examined identical twins (who share approximately 100% of their genes) and non-identical twins (who share approximately 50% of their genes) separately and adjusted for additional confounders such as peer drug use. It found, after confounder adjustment, that the associations with later hard drug use existed only for non-identical twins. This suggests a significant genetic factor in the likelihood of later hard drug usage. The study suggested that a causal role of cannabis use in later hard drug usage is minimal, if it exists at all, and that cannabis use and hard drug use share the same influencing factors such as genetics and environment.

History 
While the phrase gateway drug was first popularized by anti-drug activists such as Robert DuPont in the 1980s, the underlying ideas had already been discussed since the 1930s by using the phrases stepping-stone theory, escalation hypothesis, or progression hypothesis.

The scientific and political discussion has intensified since 1975 after the publications of several longitudinal studies by Denise Kandel and others.

In 2020, a study by the National Institute on Drug Abuse determined that marijuana use is "likely to precede use of other licit and illicit substances" and that "adults who reported marijuana use during the first wave of the survey were more likely than adults who did not use marijuana to develop an alcohol use disorder within 3 years; people who used marijuana and already had an alcohol use disorder at the outset were at greater risk of their alcohol use disorder worsening. Marijuana use is also linked to other substance use disorders including nicotine addiction." It also reported that "These findings are consistent with the idea of marijuana as a "gateway drug." However, the majority of people who use marijuana do not go on to use other, "harder" substances. Also, cross-sensitization is not unique to marijuana. Alcohol and nicotine also prime the brain for a heightened response to other drugs and are, like marijuana, also typically used before a person progresses to other, more harmful substances."

See also 
 Drug policy
 Substance abuse prevention
 Substance use disorder
 Tobacco and other drugs

References

Further reading

Scientific textbooks 
 D. B. Kandel (Ed.): Stages and Pathways of Drug Involvement: Examining the Gateway Hypothesis, Cambridge University Press, 2002, .
 Wayne Hall, Rosalie Liccardo Pacula: Is cannabis a gateway drug? In: Same authors: Cannabis Use and Dependence. Public Health and Public Policy,  Cambridge University Press, Cambridge, UK, New York, USA, 2003, chapt. 10, pp. 104–114.

Lay scientific books 
 Mark A.R. Kleiman, Jonathan P. Caulkins, Angela Hawken: Is marijuana a "gateway drug"? In: Same authors: Drugs and Drug Policy. What Everyone Needs to Know, Oxford University Press, 2011, chapt. 4, question 8, pp. 81–83.

State of research before 1974

External links 
 Is marijuana a gateway drug?, website of the National Institute on Drug Abuse at the National Institutes of Health.
  Virginia Gewin:  Smoking stokes cocaine cravings: Molecular mechanism found for controversial 'gateway drug' hypothesis, Nature News, November 2, 2011.
 Video: Eric Kandel and Denise Kandel: E-Cigarettes May Promote Illicit Drug Use and Addiction, Columbia University, January 16, 2015.

Alcohol and health
Substance dependence
Substance-related disorders
Drug policy